Jon Andreas Nödtveidt (28 June 1975 – 13 August 2006) was a Swedish musician best known as the lead guitarist and vocalist of the Swedish black metal band Dissection. He co-founded the band in 1989 with bassist Peter Palmdahl.

Career 
As the main songwriter and vocalist for Dissection he released the seminal black metal albums The Somberlain and Storm of the Light's Bane. These albums would prove to be highly influential releases for both black metal and melodic death metal.

In the beginning of his musical career, Nödtveidt formed a heavy metal band called Thunder with his brother Emil in 1988. Their songs were presented in a compilation album of Nödtveidt's music school in Strömstad.

Nödtveidt also performed in several other projects, including The Black (as Rietas), De Infernali, Nifelheim, Ophthalamia (as "Shadow"), Satanized, Siren's Yell, and Terror, a grindcore band which featured members of At the Gates.

He also worked as a journalist in Metal Zone, where he was responsible for keeping track of the growing black metal scene. He was a member of the Misanthropic Luciferian Order (MLO), now known as Temple of the Black Light, and the Werewolf Legion, a Swedish criminal organisation based in Stockholm (not to be confused with the Russian Werewolf Legion). Contrary to popular belief, Nödtveidt was not the co-creator of MLO, but "was introduced [...] by close friends at a quite early stage."

Nödtveidt was convicted of being an accessory to the 1997 murder of Josef ben Meddour, an Algerian gay man. He restarted Dissection upon his release from prison in 2004.

Death 
On 13 August 2006, Nödtveidt was found dead in his apartment in Hässelby by an apparent self-inflicted gunshot wound inside a circle of lit candles.

Early reports indicated that he was found with an open copy of the Satanic Bible, but these were later dismissed by Dissection's guitarist Set Teitan. According to him, "it's not any atheist, humanist and ego-worshipping The Satanic Bible by Anton LaVey that Jon had in front of him, but a Satanic grimoire. He despised LaVey and the 'Church of Satan'."

The said "Satanic grimoire" is reputed to be the Liber Azerate, one of the publishings of the Misanthropic Luciferian Order, by which Nödtveidt was a member since early stages of the cult. His last album Reinkaoss lyrics being co-written by his friend Vlad who wrote the Liber Azerate under the pseudonym Frater Nemidial.

Nödtveidt's brother, Emil "Nightmare Industries" Nödtveidt, the rhythm guitarist and keyboardist of gothic industrial metal band Deathstars, wrote a song named "Via the End" the night he heard about Nödtveidt's suicide. The song appears as the fifth track on Deathstar's 2009 album Night Electric Night.

Regarding his views on suicide, Nödtveidt said:

References 

1975 births
Swedish heavy metal guitarists
Swedish heavy metal singers
Swedish Luciferians
Swedish Satanists
Swedish murderers
Suicides by firearm in Sweden
Prisoners and detainees of Sweden
Black metal musicians
20th-century Swedish male singers
20th-century guitarists
Dissection (band) members
Ophthalamia members
2006 suicides
2006 deaths